Oyskhara (Oysungur, or , Oysxar) is a rural locality (a selo) in Gudermessky District of the Chechen Republic, Russia. Population:  

Until 1989, it was called Novogroznensky.

It was the site of fighting between Chechen Rebels and Russian soldiers in the First Chechen War.

References

Rural localities in Gudermessky District